Brian Martin Dowling (born 7 March 1983) is an Irish hurler who played as a right corner-forward for the Kilkenny senior team. He is now the manager of the Kilkenny senior camogie team. 

Brother of former Kilkenny hurler Seán, Dowling joined the hurling team during the 2002 National League and was a regular member of the team for just two seasons. During that time he won one Leinster winners' medal and one National Hurling League winners' medal on the field of play.

At club level Dowling is a two-time Leinster medalist with O'Loughlin Gaels. In addition to this he has also won three county club championship medals.

Camogie manager
In his first year in charge of the Kilkenny Senior camogie team in 2020 he guided the girls to an All-Ireland final win over the defending All-Ireland champions Galway of 2019 on a 1-14 to 1-11 scoreline after spending time with Ann Downey's previous year's team as a selector.

References

1983 births
Living people
O'Loughlin Gaels hurlers
Kilkenny inter-county hurlers
Waterford IT hurlers